Alejandro Restrepo Mazo (born 30 January 1982) is a Colombian football manager, currently in charge of Deportivo Pereira.

Career
Born in Medellín, Restrepo played as a youth for Estudiantil before becoming the manager of their youth categories in 2004. He left the club in 2012 to take over the under-20 side of the Liga Antioqueña de Fútbol.

Restrepo returned to Estudiantil in 2016, after a period as an assistant manager in the Colombia under-17 national team. On 31 January 2019, he was named manager of Atlético Nacional's under-20 squad.

On 24 May 2019, Restrepo was named interim manager of the main squad, after Paulo Autuori resigned. He returned to his previous role after the appointment of Juan Carlos Osorio, but was again interim in November 2020 after the latter was sacked.

After the appointment of Alexandre Guimarães as manager, Restrepo returned to his previous role, but was presented as first team manager on 9 June 2021 after Guimarães left. He left on a mutual agreement on 28 February 2022, and took over fellow top tier side Deportivo Pereira on 20 May.

Honours
Atlético Nacional
Copa Colombia: 2021

Deportivo Pereira
Categoría Primera A: 2022 Finalización

References

External links

1982 births
Living people
Sportspeople from Medellín
Colombian football managers
Categoría Primera A managers
Atlético Nacional managers
Deportivo Pereira managers
21st-century Colombian people